North Korea competed at the  2017 Asian Indoor and Martial Arts Games (as Democratic People's Republic of Korea) which was held in  Ashgabat, Turkmenistan.

North Korea sent only one participant in the event who was a young Weightlifter. North Korea didn't receive any medal at the Games.

Participants

Weightlifting

North Korea participated in weightlifting.

Men

References 

Nations at the 2017 Asian Indoor and Martial Arts Games
2017 in North Korean sport